Westfield Warringah Mall (previously known as Warringah Mall or colloquially as The Mall) is a large indoor/outdoor shopping centre in the suburb of Brookvale in the Northern Beaches region of Sydney.

Transport 
Westfield Warringah Mall has bus connections to the Sydney CBD, Lower North Shore and the Northern Beaches, as well as local surrounding suburbs. It is served by Forest Coach Lines and Keolis Downer Northern Beaches, the latter operating the B-Line services. The majority of the bus services are located on Pittwater Road and the bus interchange inside the centre. There is no railway station at Brookvale; the nearest station is located at Chatswood.

Westfield Warringah Mall also has multi-level car parks with 4,650 spaces.

History 
Warringah Mall opened on 4th April 1963 and was developed by Hammerson Group and was the second largest shopping centre at the time with Chadstone Shopping Centre being the largest. The centre was partially built on the site of 'Brookvale House', which was built by Sydney Alexander Malcolm in 1883 and was sold in 1961 to the Hooker Investment Corporation (now LJ Hooker). Warringah Mall contained around 50 stores, including David Jones, Nock & Kirby, Franklins and Woolworths. Ten years later, the centre saw the opening of a new Grace Bros. store which was upgraded from a homemakers store in 1973. The same year, a fire broke out in the original Woolworths store, killing two female workers. Fifty more speciality stores have also opened, followed by the opening of the Hoyts Twin Cinema Complex in the early 1980s.

Warringah Mall was featured in the movie BMX Bandits with two young BMX experts, P.J. (Angelo D'Angelo) and Goose (James Lugton), who meet Judy (Nicole Kidman), who was working as a trolley collector. In the mid-1980s, a Target store was opened along with 20 specialty stores. To commemorate the Australian Bicentenary, Warringah Shire Council commissioned local sculptor Victor Cusack to create a central fountain for the mall. Entitled "Pacific Family", it was unveiled by Deputy Shire President Julie Sutton on 23 November 1988.

Warringah Mall was included in the sale of Hammerson's Australian property portfolio to AMP Capital in 1994. In 1998, Warringah Mall underwent stage 2 of redevelopment and was officially opened in December 1999. The development included a new food court and entertainment precincts with the opening of Hoyts and Galaxy World, it also included the opening of new stores next to the food court including Rebel Sport, Surf Dive ‘n' Ski and Warringah Mall Library which opened near Hoyts. The old areas also had a makeover which was to introduce a quality homewares precinct with retailers such as Wheel & Barrow and Dick Smith Powerhouse in 2000. Franklins closed in 2001 and was by replaced by Priceline Pharmacy. The same year German global discount supermarket Aldi opened outside the centre on the corner of Cross and Green Street. Aldi previously had plans to open inside the centre but was rejected by AMP Capital due to disputes between rival supermarkets Coles and Woolworths.

In March 2003 Westfield Group established a 25 per cent ownership with AMP Capital, this was changed to 50 per cent in October 2012. AMP Capital and the Westfield Group swapped interests in seven centres, including Warringah Mall which became a 50/50 joint venture between the two companies. As part of the deal, centre management transferred from AMP to Westfield with the centre rebranded Westfield Warringah Mall. In July 2014, as part of a, restructure of the Westfield Group, it came under the control of the Scentre Group.

Recent development 
In mid-2015, Westfield Warringah Mall underwent a $310 million redevelopments. Stage 1 of the redevelopment has been completed with the opening of the 5-level multi-storey car park and a new fresh food court opened by My Kitchen Rules 2015 winners Will and Steve.

Stage 2 of the redevelopment was completed in November 2016. Myer was temporarily closed for refurbishment and was opened by Australian model Jennifer Hawkins.

Stage 2 consists of:
 A brand new refurbished Myer
 A brand new H&M
 A new two level parallel mall linking Myer and the existing centre
 New refurbished centre court
 70 new stores (including 50 fashion stores including H&M and Sephora)

Future 
Plans for the $226 million redevelopment will include a new relocated Hoyts Cinema on level 3, addition of 35 food outlets including licensed premises together, 15 speciality retailers, 10 small outlets and one major store. They will be located on the three levels as part of the additional 10,000sqm of extra retail space. The existing food court on level 1 will be expanded to the south with addition of six food court outlets. The restaurant precinct on level two will feature views overlooking Brookvale Creek and the Warringah golf course. The redevelopment will add modifications to existing specialty stores and the existing Kmart store on the ground level are also planned. The number of parking spaces will increase to a total of 5,093. This development follows the 2008 master plan of the centre. A 14-month timeline has been estimated for completion of the project. The plans for the centre had been decided in May.

Tenants
Westfield Warringah Mall has 131,589m² of floor space. The major retailers include David Jones, Myer, Big W, Kmart, Coles, Woolworths, Bunnings, Cotton On, H&M, JB Hi-Fi, Rebel, Anaconda, iPlay and Hoyts Cinema

Incidents 
 On 29 August 1969, a security guard Joseph Charles Coffman, 39, of Barrenjoey Road, Newport, was shot and killed by an unknown assailant. It appeared that Coffman was attacked from behind with a blow to the neck, and then shot through the shoulder with what appeared to have been his own revolver. 17,000 cigarettes were found at the scene, so Coffman may have interrupted a robbery in progress. Les Howarth, a 15 year old youth of Balgowlah, accompanied Mr Coffman on his patrol, who was asleep in the security service car at the time of the shooting. A vehicle was seen speeding away from the mall, and a stolen car was found abandoned 17 kilometres away in Kuringai Chase.
On 2 May 2012, a man was fatally stabbed at a bus stop at around 11:40pm. He was given first aid before paramedics arrived and he was taken to the Royal North Shore Hospital. But he was declared dead on arrival. A 25-year-old male had been arrested but found not guilty due to mental illness.
 On 23 June 2015, a security guard was almost set on fire by a man who was high on ice. The security guard found the man slumped over on the stairs, unresponsive and with his eyes closed.
 On 21 April 2016, a section of the centre was evacuated following reports of a possible bomb threat at the construction site. Access to a small parking area was restricted and the construction site was evacuated from the area at the North of the site, but shoppers were not affected.
On 7 January 2019, a woman was stabbed by a teenage girl while trying to break up a fight at a nail salon at around 3:00 pm. Two teenage girls, aged 14 and 13, had an altercation when the woman intervened and suffered a knife injury to her arm. Paramedics treated the woman at the scene before being taken to Royal North Shore Hospital. The 13-year-old was later charged.

References

External links
Westfield Warringah Mall Official Website

Westfield Group
Shopping centres in Sydney
Shopping malls established in 1963
1963 establishments in Australia